OK, I'm Sick is the debut studio album by the American rock band Badflower, released on February 22, 2019. The album debuted at number 140 on the US Billboard 200. Loudwire named it one of the 50 best rock albums of 2019.

History
Badflower released the album's lead single, "Ghost", on June 8, 2018. On November 1, 2018, Badflower announced the album with a release date of February 22, 2019.

Second single "x ANA x" was released on November 16, 2018, with the third single, "Heroin", following on December 6, 2018. The fourth single, "Promise Me", was released on February 15, 2019.

Track listing
All tracks are written by Badflower and Noah Shain except "Heroin", written by Badflower. All tracks are produced by Noah Shain except "Heroin", produced by Josh Katz.

Personnel
Adapted credits from the liner and inlay notes of OK, I'm Sick.

Badflower
 Josh Katz – lead vocals, rhythm guitar
 Joey Morrow – lead guitar, backing vocals
 Alex Espiritu – bass
 Anthony Sonetti – drums

Production
 Chris Lord-Alge – mixing
 Brian Judd – assistant mixing
 Adam Chagnon – additional engineering
 Ted Jensen – mastering

Artwork
 Tyler Shields – photographer
 Sandi Spika Borchetta – art direction
 Justin Ford – art direction, graphic design
 John Varvatos – wardrobe
 Rian Rettino (cover image), Jessica Erlandsen (interior image) – grooming

Charts

References

2019 debut albums
Big Machine Records albums